The 1993–94 English Hockey League season took place from October 1993 until April 1994.

The Men's National League was sponsored by PizzaExpress and won by Havant. The Women's National League was won by Leicester.

The Men's Hockey Association Cup was won by Teddington and the AEWHA Cup was won by Slough.

Men's Pizza Express National League First Division League Standings

Women's National League Premier Division League Standings

Men's Cup (Hockey Association Cup)

Quarter-finals

Semi-finals

Final 
(Held at University of Birmingham on 15 May) 

Teddington
Garry Meredith, Phil McGuire, Simon Nicklin, Jimmy Wallis, Tony Colclough, Clive Camburn, Jon Hauck, Tyrone Moore, Peter Gibbins, Jason Laslett (capt), Andy Billson
Old Loughtonians
Alasdair Seaton (capt), Gerald Crymble, Julian Halls, Ian Morrison, D Allen, Colin Hector, Neil Barker, Chris Gladman, Nick Thompson, Paul Krishman, Alan Philpot

Women's Cup (AEWHA Cup)

Quarter-finals

Semi-finals

Final 
(Held at Milton Keynes on 14 May)

Slough
Sue Knight, Ali Burd, Mandy Pottow, Sue Chandler, Michelle Hall, Sam Wright, Anna Bennett, Karen Brown (capt), Lesley Hobley, Julie Robertson, Kate White sub Helen Thornalley
Hightown
Carolyn Reid, Fiona Lee, Maggie Souyave, Julie Aspin, Linda Carr, Michaela Morton, Jackie Crook, Lorraine Marsden (capt), Chris Cook, Tina Cullen, Donna Mills subs Lucy Newcombe, N Jones

References 

1993
field hockey
field hockey
1993 in field hockey
1994 in field hockey